Ferretti S.p.A. (trading as Ferretti Group) is an Italian multinational shipbuilding company headquartered in Forlì which specialises in the design, construction and sale of luxury motor yachts. Its products are sold under the brands Ferretti Yachts, Custom Line, Pershing, Itama, Riva, Mochi Craft and CRN.

Ferretti was founded in 1968 by Alessandro and Norberto Ferretti as a manufacturer of small boats and produced its first motor sailer in 1971. Ferretti expanded through making numerous acquisitions, including of Cantieri Navali dell’Adriatico – CNA S.r.l. in 1998, CRN S.p.A., in 1999, Riva S.p.A. in 2000, Cantiere Navale Mario Morini and in 2002, Itama in 2004 and Allied Marine in 2008. Ferretti was acquired by the Chinese multinational heavy machinery and automotive manufacturing company Weichai Group in 2012.

Ferretti has manufacturing operations in Italy and the United States. It has subsidiary companies in the United States (Ferretti Group North America), Brazil (Ferretti Group Brazil, based in São Paulo, and soon one based in Foz do Iguaçu ) and representative branches in Hong Kong and Shanghai (Ferretti Group Asia Pacific).

History

1968 to 2000
The company was founded in 1968 by Alessandro and Norberto Ferretti and produced its first motor sailer in 1971. During the 1980s, the two brothers decided to specialize in the production of luxury motoryachts. They established a new unit in Forlì, which today houses the company headquarters.

In the early 1990s, Ferretti started an internationalisation process. In 1993, Ferretti of America, Inc. was founded to market motoryachts in the United States, Canada, Mexico, Venezuela and the Caribbean. Ferretti of America liaised with the sales network that was already present in Greece, France, Spain, Germany and Great Britain, increasing the impact of Ferretti sales abroad.

In 1994, Ferretti began an international marketing process by creating a strategic network of dealers outside Europe.

During the second half of the 1990s, after institutional investors acquired a share in the capital, an expansion strategy for external lines was started through the acquisition of companies producing luxury motoryachts.

In 1996, Ferretti began operating in the segment of yachts with fibreglass flybridges, measuring 28 to 40 metres in length, through Custom Line S.p.A.

In 1998, the group purchased Cantieri Navali dell’Adriatico – CNA S.r.l., which specialized in building open type motor boats with the prestigious Pershing brand.

During the same year, Ferretti entered in the sport fisherman craft segment with the acquisition of American company Bertram Yacht, Inc. - the Miami shipyard. Bertram Yacht was sold in 2015.

In 1999, Ferretti Group purchased CRN S.p.A., a shipyard specialising in the production of maxiyachts in fibreglass and megayachts with steel hulls and aluminium superstructures, measuring over 30 metres in length.

2000 to 2010

In the year 2000, Ferretti purchased 100% of the capital of Riva S.p.A., a producer of luxury fibreglass yachts measuring 10 to 35 metres in length, both flybridge and open.
 
In June 2000, with the aim of further consolidating its growth and development process, Ferretti Group decided to list on the Official Italian Stock Exchange (MTA). In 2001, the company was admitted to the STAR segment (High Requisite Share Segment) of the Borsa Italiana (Italian Stock Exchange).

In May 2001, Ferretti acquired the assets of the Oram shipyard in La Spezia, where the new Riva production area would subsequently be built.

In August 2001, Ferretti finalized an agreement for the acquisition of the Apreamare S.p.A. shipyards in Sorrento, a leader in the production of gozzo sorrentino boats measuring 7 to 16 metres in length.

In November 2001, acquisition of the Mochi Craft S.r.l. shipyard in Pesaro was finalized.

In 2002, the Group took over Diesse Arredamenti, in order to acquire new skills in the nautical furnishings sector, complementary to its yacht building activity.

In 2002, the Group also finalized acquisition of Cantiere Navale Mario Morini in Ancona, which enabled CRN to extend its production capacity, Pinmar S.L., a company specialized in yacht painting and refitting, and Zago S.p.A., an Italian company operating in high-profile wooden manufactured pieces and furnishings.

Between June 2002 and January 2003, the Ferretti management team and institutional investors present among the shareholders (Permira), decided to launch a Voluntary Public Tender Offer to acquire the entire share capital of the Company, with the aim of further expanding the Group through acquisitions and a precise strategic, national and international plan.

In 2004, through Pershing, Ferretti Group acquired the Itama shipyard, which specializes in the construction of open motoryachts, completing the current definition of the Group.

In 2008, Ferretti Group acquired the assets, brands and activities of Allied Marine, an American company specialized in After Sales services and marketing of both new yachts and pre-owned motor yachts, as well as brokerage services on the US market.

In 2009, in order to align its organisational structure to the new market scenario, Ferretti Group changed its structure and undertook a series of strategic and operative actions.

The Group's equity was divided between Norberto Ferretti and the management (38.2%), Mediobanca (8.8%), and senior and mezzanine lenders (the latter with a total 53% in exit participation rights). Norberto Ferretti, the Group's management and Mediobanca held 100% of the Group's voting rights.

2009 to present

In December 2009, with the aim of continuing to focus on its core business, the Ferretti Group sold its 60% holding in Pinmar S.L., a Spanish company specializing in painting mega-yachts to Irish entrepreneur Sean Ewing. In March 2010, Ferretti continued its divestment policy by selling 100% of Apreamare S.p.A., which included the nautical pole of Torre Annunziata (Naples), to the Aprea and Pollia families, the founders of the historic Sorrento brand.

In 2010, Ferretti Group Brasil was established.

Finally, in 2012, Ferretti was acquired by the Chinese multinational heavy machinery and automotive manufacturing company Weichai Group.

Operations

Divisions and subsidiaries

The group consists of the following design and production companies:

Ferretti Yachts (flybridge motoryachts, 14 to 29 meters)
Pershing (high performance open cruisers, 16 to 42 meters)
Itama (open motoryachts, 13 to 23 meters)
Riva (open and flybridge motoryachts, 8 to 50 meters)
Mochi Craft (lobster boats, 13 to 23 meters)
CRN (custom megayachts in steel and aluminium, 45 to 90 meters).
Custom Line (planing and semi-displacement motoryachts, 28 to 42 meters)

Shipyards
Ferretti Group has production facilities in: Ancona, Forlì, Cattolica, Mondolfo, La Spezia and Sarnico, Italy.

Corporate affairs

Financial data
In 2010, Ferretti Group had a turnover of approximately 500 million euro  and EBITDA of around 30 million euro. The improvement of this result, in a market still characterized by price pressure, was primarily due to the key initiatives taken by the Ferretti Group during the course of the 2009-2010 nautical year, which resulted in a cost reduction of around 50 million euro. As of August, 31st, 2010, the Group's Net Financial Debt improved compared with the previous year and was reduced to around 590 million euro, basically in line with the Plan.

Ownership
In 1995, after the sudden death of Alessandro Ferretti, 70% of the group was acquired by Permira. In 2000, it was temporarily listed in the Italian Stock Exchange, but decided to be taken private citing concerns for negative financial climate by the September 11, 2001 attacks. Permira had a 54 times return of its original investment from the listing.

In October 2006, the owners reconsidered flotation and filed an application to list its shares on the Milan stock exchange. Due to a high level of interest from private equity buyers, the IPO was postponed. Candover bought 60% of the company in an auction, outbidding the French PAI Partners and leaving the rest 30% to the founder and 10% to Permira. Based on financial data, the group was valued at 1.7 billion euros.

In May 2008, when the full extend of the crisis had not yet hit, rumours circulated indicating Candover was eyeing a second IPO for the business which was seeing profits of EUR 158m on a EUR 933m turnover (2007). In September, the Consob granted the authorization for the IPO on both the London and Milan bourses.

However, in January 2009, the company appointed Rothschild to advise on talks with its banking syndicate, led by Royal Bank of Scotland (RBS) and Mediobanca to restructure a EUR 1.1bn debt. Initially Candover was expected to participate in a EUR 100m capital injection but by February, it had walked away from the table, writing off its investment; Permira had already done so.

Since then the company has succeeded in renegotiating its debt, reducing its to EUR 550m against a conversion of credits into exit participation rights, a EUR 85m capital injection underwritten by the founder and CEO, Norberto Ferretti and some of the management team (EUR 70m) and Mediobanca (EUR 15m). RBS has also agreed to grantmedium terms facilities to fund working capital requirements (EUR 65m) and three major financial institutions (already partnering with Ferretti), have extended the short-term facilities (EUR 24m) to medium-term ones.

The Group's equity is now held by Norberto Ferretti and the Group's management (38.2%), Mediobanca (8.8%) and senior and mezzanine lenders (for a total of 53% in exit participation rights). In particular, as a result of the agreement, Norberto Ferretti, the Group's management and Mediobanca hold 100% of the Group's voting rights.

Racing
Motivated by the needs for high tech synergy and greater international recognition, the company entered in 1989, into offshore racing. Norberto Ferretti won the Class 1 Offshore World Championship title in 1994.

The Ferretti team win the European Offshore Championship in 1995. In 1997, it won both European and World champion titles. The company attributes these winnings to a hi-tech hull designed with a carbon-fiber autoclave.

Technology
Together with Mitsubishi the Ferretti group has developed a system called ARG (anti-rolling gyro), which reduces the effects of the waves on their boats, using a counterweight and a gyroscope.

Notable customers
Notable Ferretti customers have included Richard Burton, Brigitte Bardot and Sophia Loren.

References

External links 

Ferretti Brand Official Site 
Videos of Superyachts build by Ferretti

 
Weichai Group
Manufacturing companies established in 1968
Companies listed on the Borsa Italiana
Shipbuilding companies of Italy
Italian boat builders
Private equity portfolio companies
Italian brands
Yacht building companies
Multinational companies headquartered in Italy
Engineering companies of Italy
Italian companies established in 1968